Władysław Aleksander Łubieński (1703–1767) was archbishop of Lwów (1758–59) and primate of Poland (1759–1767). He was an ally of the Czartoryski Familia and of the Russian Empire and an opponent of religious tolerance. He acted as Interrex in 1763–1764, after the death of King Augustus III of Poland and prior to the election of Stanisław August Poniatowski as king of the Polish–Lithuanian Commonwealth.

References

External links
 Virtual tour Gniezno Cathedral 
List of Primates of Poland 

|-

1703 births
1767 deaths
Archbishops of Gniezno
Archbishops of Lviv
18th-century Roman Catholic archbishops in the Polish–Lithuanian Commonwealth
Recipients of the Order of the White Eagle (Poland)